A lessa was a customary unit of area used in the Indian state of Manipur and neighbouring regions. After metrication in the mid-20th century, the unit became obsolete.

Size
The conversion of the lessa is still debated to this day.

See also
 Pari
 Sana lamjel
 Bigha
 Katha (unit)

References

Customary units in India
Units of area
Obsolete units of measurement